The 8th constituency of the Hauts-de-Seine is a French legislative constituency in the Hauts-de-Seine département.

Description

Hauts-de-Seine's 8th constituency lies in the south west of the department and borders Yvelines to the west. The constituency includes the towns of Chaville, Meudon and Sèvres all of which surround the northern edge of the Forest of Meudon.

The seat is traditionally strongly conservative and has elected deputies from the Gaullist right since its creation in 1967.

Historic Representative

Election results

2022

 
 
 
 
 
 
 
|-
| colspan="8" bgcolor="#E9E9E9"|
|-

2017

2012

2007

 
 
 
 
 
|-
| colspan="8" bgcolor="#E9E9E9"|
|-

2002

 
 
 
 
 
 
|-
| colspan="8" bgcolor="#E9E9E9"|
|-
 
 

 
 
 
 
 

* Withdrew before the 2nd round

1997

 
 
 
 
 
 
 
|-
| colspan="8" bgcolor="#E9E9E9"|
|-

Sources

 Official results of French elections from 1998: 

8